Priobye railway station() is a railway station on the Ivdel-Priobye line in Priobye, Oktyabrsky District, Khanty-Mansi Autonomous Okrug, Russia. It is the terminal passenger station of the Severny Ural line between Moscow and Priobye, a journey that takes about two days.

Trains

References

Railway stations in Khanty-Mansi Autonomous Okrug